Andrew Wright may refer to:
Andrew Wright (artist) (born 1971), Canadian multimedia artist
Andrew Wright (cricketer) (born 1980), English cricketer
Andrew Wright (footballer) (born 1985), English footballer
Andrew Barkworth Wright (1895–1971), British Army officer and colonial official

See also
Andy Wright (disambiguation)